Prem Kumar Dhumal, the leader of BJP was sworn in as the chief minister of Himachal Pradesh on 30 December 2007. On 9 January 2008, Dhumal inducted 9 cabinet ministers. On 9 July 2009 2 cabinet ministers were inducted taking the strength of the cabinet to 12.

Council of Ministers 

|}

References 

Himachal Pradesh ministries
Bharatiya Janata Party state ministries
Cabinets established in 2007